German submarine U-206 was a Type VIIC U-boat of the Kriegsmarine during World War II. The submarine was laid down on 17 June 1940 by the Friedrich Krupp Germaniawerft yard at Kiel as yard number 635, launched on 4 April 1941 and commissioned on 17 May under the command of Oberleutnant zur See Herbert Opitz.

She was possibly sunk in November 1941 by a British-laid minefield.

Design
German Type VIIC submarines were preceded by the shorter Type VIIB submarines. U-206 had a displacement of  when at the surface and  while submerged. She had two shafts and two  propellers.

U-206 was fitted with five  torpedo tubes (four fitted at the bow and one at the stern), fourteen torpedoes, one  SK C/35 naval gun, 220 rounds, and a  C/30 anti-aircraft gun. The boat had a complement of between forty-four and sixty.

The partner city (Patenstadt) that sponsored the construction of the submarine was Reichenberg, and she bore the city's coat of arms.

Service history
Part of the 3rd U-boat Flotilla, U-206 carried out three patrols in the North Atlantic:

First patrol
U-206s first patrol began when she left Trondheim in Norway on 5 August 1941; she travelled through the gap between Iceland and the Faroe Islands and headed south, towards the west of Ireland. She sank the Ocean Victor on 9 August south of Iceland.

On 26 August, U-206 rescued (against the regulations) from two rubber dinghies six British No. 612 Squadron RAF crew of the Armstrong Whitworth Whitley Mk. V, after its engine had failed during an anti-submarine patrol. They were brought to St. Nazaire, and later to POW camps; soon after the rescue, the British were able to smuggle intelligence back to Britain, describing the submarine and the St. Nazaire port. She was the first submarine that brought British POWs to France.

She arrived at St. Nazaire in occupied France on 10 September.

Second patrol

Third patrol and loss
U-206 was posted missing from 29 November 1941. She is believed to have been the victim of a minefield laid by the RAF, (code-named 'Beech'), west of St. Nazaire. Forty-six men died; there were no survivors. The men were pronounced dead in March 1942.

Wolfpacks
U-206 took part in four wolfpacks, namely:
 Grönland (10 – 23 August 1941)
 Kurfürst (23 August – 2 September 1941)
 Seewolf (2 – 7 September 1941)
 Breslau (2 – 23 October 1941)

Summary of raiding history

Location
Since 2018, research to locate the submarine has been ongoing; some twenty possible wrecks have been identified, and dives are planned for 2020.

References

Notes

Citations

Bibliography

External links

World War II submarines of Germany
German Type VIIC submarines
U-boats commissioned in 1941
U-boats sunk in 1941
U-boats sunk by mines
Missing U-boats of World War II
1941 ships
Ships lost with all hands
Ships built in Kiel
Maritime incidents in November 1941